Ondina crystallina is a species of sea snail, a marine gastropod mollusk in the family Pyramidellidae, the pyrams and their allies.

Description
The length of the shell measures 2 mm.

Distribution
This species occurs in the following locations:
 European waters (ERMS scope)
 Portuguese Exclusive Economic Zone
 Spanish Exclusive Economic Zone
 Mediterranean Sea

References

 Templado, J. and R. Villanueva 2010 Checklist of Phylum Mollusca. pp. 148–198 In Coll, M., et al., 2010. The biodiversity of the Mediterranean Sea: estimates, patterns, and threats. PLoS ONE 5(8):36pp.

External links
 To CLEMAM
 To Encyclopedia of Life
 To World Register of Marine Species
 

Pyramidellidae
Gastropods described in 1892